Sir David Dalrymple, 1st Baronet, of Hailes (1665 – 3 December 1721) was a Scottish advocate and politician who sat in the Parliament of Scotland from 1698 to 1707 and in the British House of Commons from 1707 to 1721. He served as Lord Advocate, and eventually Auditor of the Exchequer in Scotland in 1720.

Early life
Dalrymple was the fifth and youngest son of James Dalrymple, 1st Viscount of Stair and his wife Margaret Ross, daughter of James Ross of Balneil, Wigtown.

He was educated at the University of Edinburgh and was awarded MA in 1681, and then studied at the University of Utrecht in 1682. He was admitted a member of the Faculty of Advocates on 3 November 1688.

Career

Dalrymple was elected to represent Culross in 1698 in the Parliament of Scotland, as a member of the Stair–Queensberry alliance. He was created baronet on 8 May 1701 and was also appointed joint solicitor-general for Scotland and auditor of treasury of Scotland in 1701. He was a Commissioner for the union with England in 1702, and again in 1706 when he was one of the Commissioners who negotiated the Act of Union 1707.

In 1707 Dalrymple was one of the Scottish representatives to the first Parliament of Great Britain and at the 1708 British general election, he was returned as Member of Parliament for Haddington. In 1709 he was promoted from solicitor-general to the post of Lord Advocate of Scotland . Also in 1709, he bought Whitehills House, renaming it Newhailes after the Dalrymple's Castle Hailes.  He was returned again for Haddington at the 1710 British general election. In 1711 he lost the post of Lord Advocate under the Tory administration. In 1712, he was elected Dean of the Faculty of Advocates which he held for the rest of his life.    He was returned again at the 1713 British general election and regained his post as Lord Advocate in 1714.

Dalrymple was returned as MP for Haddington at the 1715 British general election. He was Commissioner of visitation for Glasgow University in 1717 and 1718, and for St Andrews University in 1718. He was appointed auditor general of the Scottish Exchequer in 1720.

Personal life
On 4 April 1691 he married Janet, daughter of Sir James Rocheid of Inverleith, the widow of Alexander Murray of Melgund. By his wife he had three sons and one daughter:

 Andrew Dalrymple (1684–1762), who emigrated to Massachusetts Bay Colony; he married Dorothy Shepherd.
 Sir James Dalrymple, 2nd Baronet (1692–1751), of Hailes, East Lothian.
 Hugh Dalrymple (1695–1741), who married Isobel Sommerville and later took the surname Dalrymple-Murray-Kynnynmond.
 Janet Dalrymple (1698–1776), who married Sir John Baird, 2nd Baronet of Newbyth, MP for Edinburghshire. After his death, she married Gen. James St Clair of Dysart, MP.

Dalrymple died on 3 December 1721. He was succeeded in his baronetcy by his son, James, as his eldest son, Andrew, emigrated to the Massachusetts Bay Colony around 1711, giving up his right to the family title.

Descendants
Through his son Hugh, he was a grandfather of Agnes Dalrymple-Murray-Kynynmound, who married Sir Gilbert Elliot, 3rd Baronet, of Minto.

Legacy
Dalrymple was an enthusiastic bibliophile and added a remarkable Library Wing to Newhailes to accommodate his large book collection.  This extension to the building was completed in around 1722.

References

External links
The Extinct and Dormant Baronetcies of England, Ireland, and Scotland, by Messrs. John and John Bernard Burke, second edition, London, 1841, p. 620.
Oxford Dictionary of National Biography

1665 births
1721 deaths
Alumni of the University of Edinburgh
Utrecht University alumni
Dalrymple, David, 1st Baronet
Lord Advocates
Members of the Parliament of Great Britain for Scottish constituencies
Burgh Commissioners to the Parliament of Scotland
Members of the Faculty of Advocates
Deans of the Faculty of Advocates
Politics of Fife
Politics of East Lothian
Government audit officials
Members of the Parliament of Scotland 1689–1702
Members of the Parliament of Scotland 1702–1707
Younger sons of viscounts
British MPs 1707–1708
British MPs 1708–1710
British MPs 1710–1713
British MPs 1713–1715
British MPs 1715–1722